Competent Crew is the entry-level course of the Royal Yachting Association for those who wish to be active crew members of a sailing yacht. It is a hands-on course and by the end of the course participants should be able to steer, handle sails, keep a lookout, row a dinghy and assist in all the day-to-day duties on board.

No pre-course knowledge or experience are assumed. The minimum duration of the course is 5 days. It may be run over 5 days or over 3 weekends or 3 days plus a weekend. For those who have done the Start Yachting course, this course can be completed in 3 or 4 days. There is no minimum age.

Course content 
Knowledge of sea terms and parts of a boat, sail handling, ropework, fire precautions and fighting, personal safety equipment, man overboard, emergency equipment, meteorology, seasickness, helmsmanship, general duties, manners and customs, rules of the road, dinghies.

Progression 
The Competent Crew course is one of a structured series of courses run by the RYA. Additional courses in the series include Day Skipper Shorebased & Practical, Coastal Skipper and Yachtmaster Shorebased, Coastal Skipper Practical, .

See also
Day Skipper
Coastal Skipper
Yachtmaster

References

Further reading

External links 
 Royal Yachting Association

Sailing qualifications